The Helsinki Metropolitan Area Council was a co-operation agency operating in the Helsinki Metropolitan Area, now replaced by HSL and HSY. The organisation had a few responsibilities, most notably regional public transport and waste management. It was subordinated to the city councils of the four participating cities (Helsinki, Vantaa, Espoo and Kauniainen). Furthermore, transport cooperation also included neighboring municipalities of Kerava and Kirkkonummi.

Economy
The Metropolitan Council used €155.6 million in 2002 and its income was €160.3 million. Traffic and waste management make up 97% of its expenditure. About 70% of the income consisted of customer fees for public transport and waste management.

Transportation management

The Metropolitan Council grouped together different Public Transportation companies operating in the Metropolitan area, such as HKL, operator of the metro, Suomenlinna ferry service and bus services within the Helsinki region, and published a timetable of all public transport quarterly, and provided a public transport route planner service on the Internet. It also ran ticketing and prices, fixing prices at the same level for all public transportation, irrespective of method or transportation company. These services are now (since January 1, 2010) provided by Helsingin seudun liikenne.

Most tickets were bought using the electronic travel cards, a smart card service run by Buscom. These travel cards supported two types of payment for trips:

If the same travel card was loaded with both value and period, period took priority when applicable to the current zone. If the period ran out, or the passenger travelled to a zone where the period was not applicable, value was used instead.

The travel cards were bought through certain shops and Public Transport Information Centres.

The Helsinki Metropolitan Area Council managed the following zones before 2010:

 Helsinki
 Espoo and Kauniainen
 Vantaa
 Regional traffic 1: Helsinki, Espoo, Kauniainen and Vantaa
 Regional traffic 2: Espoo, Kauniainen, Vantaa, Kerava and Kirkkonummi (excluding Helsinki)
 Entire region: Helsinki, Espoo, Kauniainen, Vantaa, Kerava and Kirkkonummi

Mission
The mission of the Metropolitan Council was to improve the capital area's development by high quality public transports, waste management and air protection. In addition a "development planning unit" has the purpose to increase cooperation between the four town-administrations involved, particularly regarding planning of land use.

External links
 Helsinki Metropolitan Area Council – A now defunct site
 HSL – Helsinki Regional Transport Authority
 HSY – Helsinki Region Environmental Services Authority 
 Journey Planner 

Espoo
Organisations based in Helsinki
Politics of Finland
Vantaa
Economy of Helsinki